The 1961 Australian federal election was held in Australia on 9 December 1961. All 122 seats in the House of Representatives and 31 of the 60 seats in the Senate were up for election. The incumbent Liberal–Country coalition led by Prime Minister Robert Menzies defeated the opposition Labor Party under Arthur Calwell, despite losing the two-party-preferred popular vote. In his first election as Labor leader, Calwell significantly reduced the Coalition's margin, gaining 15 seats to leave the government with only a two-seat majority. This was the first and only time that a Federal Government won a sixth consecutive term in office.

Future opposition leader and Governor General Bill Hayden entered parliament at this election.

Issues
Due to a credit squeeze, the economy had gone into a brief recession in 1961 and unemployment had risen to high levels. This saw an increase in popularity for Labor; Menzies' case was not helped by an approach seen by the press, notably The Sydney Morning Herald, as inappropriately paternalistic. The Herald, which had long supported Menzies, switched sides to support Calwell and Labor, which gave Calwell the confidence to mount a spirited campaign. These factors were enough to see a swing against the Menzies Government.

Results

House of Representatives

Senate

Notes
In New South Wales, Queensland, and Victoria, the coalition parties ran a joint ticket. Of the eight senators elected on a joint ticket, five were members of the Liberal Party and three were members of the Country Party. In Western Australia, the coalition parties ran on separate tickets. In South Australia and Tasmania, only the Liberal Party ran a ticket.
The sole independent elected was Reg Turnbull of Tasmania.
"Other" includes 7,430 votes for "Pensioners" and 2,599 votes for the Commonwealth Centre Party.

Seats changing hands

 Members listed in italics did not contest their seat at this election.

Significance
For a long time, the 1961 election remained the closest Federal election in Australian history, with the Coalition being reduced to the barest majority. Despite not having a majority of seats in New South Wales and Queensland the Coalition retained all of their seats in Victoria and could retain power. The election was decided in the seats of Bruce near Melbourne and Moreton near Brisbane.

In Bruce, Labor's Keith Ewert led Liberal Billy Snedden on the first count, but on the second count more than two-thirds of the DLP's preferences flowed to Snedden, enough to give him the victory.

However, the Coalition was not ensured of a sixth term in government until Jim Killen won Moreton by only 130 votes. Labor actually won 62 seats, the same as the Coalition. However, without Bruce, the best Labor could hope for was a hung parliament, since two of its seats were in ACT and Northern Territory. At the time, territorial MPs had limited voting rights and were not counted for the purpose of determining who was to form government. The record for the closest election in Australia's history was eventually beaten by the 2010 election, which was a 72-72 seat draw.

The most notable casualty was Earle Page, the third-longest serving MP in Australia's history, and briefly Prime Minister. He had been the member for Cowper since 1919. Although he was 81 years old and gravely ill with lung cancer, he decided to fight his 17th general election. His Labor opponent, Frank McGuren, needed a seemingly daunting 11-point swing to win the seat, but won by a slim three-point margin on the second count. Page, who had been too sick to actively campaign, died 11 days after the election without ever knowing he had been defeated.

See also
 Candidates of the Australian federal election, 1961
 Members of the Australian House of Representatives, 1961–1963
 Members of the Australian Senate, 1962–1965

Notes

References
University of WA  election results in Australia since 1890
AEC 2PP vote
Prior to 1984 the AEC did not undertake a full distribution of preferences for statistical purposes. The stored ballot papers for the 1983 election were put through this process prior to their destruction. Therefore, the figures from 1983 onwards show the actual result based on full distribution of preferences.

Federal elections in Australia
1961 elections in Australia
December 1961 events in Australia